Carlos Adueza (12 February 1932 – 16 April 1977) was a Chilean rower. He competed in the 1952 Summer Olympics.

References

1932 births
1977 deaths
Rowers at the 1952 Summer Olympics
Chilean male rowers
Olympic rowers of Chile